Miyako district may refer to:
 Miyako District, Fukuoka, Japan
 Miyako District, Okinawa, Japan